Wojna is a surname. Notable people with the surname include:

Abrahan Wojna, Spelling variant of Abraham Woyna, Roman Catholic priest, bishop of Vilnius (and other offices)
 Ed Wojna (born 1960), American baseball pitcher
 Valerie Wojna, Puerto Rican neurologist

See also 

Woyna
Vaina